The Khorchin (Mongolian  , Chinese 科尔沁 Kē'ěrqìn) dialect is a variety of Mongolian spoken in the east of Inner Mongolia, namely in Hinggan League, in the north, north-east and east of Hinggan and in all but the south of the Tongliao region. There were 2.08 million Khorchin Mongols in China in 2000, so the Khorchin dialect may well have more than one million speakers, making it the largest dialect of Inner Mongolia.

Phonology

Consonants 

Then, *u (<*<*u) has regressively assimilated to  before *p, e.g. *putaha (Written Mongolian budaγ-a) > pata ‘rice’. However, less systematic changes that pertain only to a number of words are far more notable, e.g. 'capacity'> Khorchin . 'many').

Vowels 

On the other hand, *ö is absent, e.g. This also resulted in a vowel harmony system that is rather different from Chakhar and Khalkha:  may appear in non-initial syllables of words without regard for vowel harmony, as may  (e.g. 'horses' and  'expensive'; Khalkha would have  'horses' and ). E.g. *mori-bar 'by horse' > Khorchin  vs. Jalaid subdialect .

Morphology

Khorchin uses the old comitative  to delimit an action within a certain time. A similar function is fulfilled by the suffix  that is, however, restricted to environments in the past stratum. In contrast to other Mongolian varieties, in Khorchin Chinese verbs can be directly borrowed; other varieties have to borrow Chinese verbs as Mongolian nouns and then derive these to verbs. Compare the new loan  'to ask for money' < zhāngluó (张罗) with the older loan  'to borrow' < jiè (借) that is present in all Mongolian varieties and contains the derivational suffix .

Notes

References

Citations

Sources 
 Bayančoγtu (2002): Qorčin aman ayalγun-u sudulul. Kökeqota: Öbür mongγul-un yeke surγaγuli-yin keblel-ün qoriy-a.
 Qai yan (2003): Qorčin aman ayalγu ba aru qorčin aman ayalγun-u abiyan-u ǰarim neyitelig ončaliγ. In: Öbür mongγul-un ündüsüten-ü yeke surγaγuli 2005/3: 91-94.
 Sečenbaγatur et al. (2005): Mongγul kelen-ü nutuγ-un ayalγun-u sinǰilel-ün uduridqal. Kökeqota: Öbür mongγul-un arad-un keblel-ün qoriy-a.
 Svantesson, Jan-Olof, Anna Tsendina, Anastasia Karlsson, Vivan Franzén (2005): The Phonology of Mongolian. New York: Oxford University Press.

Agglutinative languages
Mongolic languages
Central Mongolic languages